The 2008 NCAA Division I Cross Country Championships were the 70th annual NCAA Men's Division I Cross Country Championship and the 28th annual NCAA Women's Division I Cross Country Championship to determine the team and individual national champions of NCAA Division I men's and women's collegiate cross country running in the United States. In all, four different titles were contested: men's and women's individual and team championships.

Held on November 24, 2008, the combined meet was the fifth of eight consecutive meets hosted by Indiana State University at the LaVern Gibson Championship Cross Country Course in Terre Haute, Indiana.  The distance for the men's race was 10 kilometers (6.21 miles) while the distance for the women's race was 6 kilometers (3.73 miles). 

The men's team championship was again won by Oregon (93 points), the Ducks' second consecutive and sixth overall. The women's team championship was won by Washington (79 points), the Huskies' first.

The two individual champions were, for the men, Galen Rupp (Oregon, 29:03.2) and, for the women, Sally Kipyego (Texas Tech, 19:28.1). It was Kipyego's record third consecutive title.

Men's title
Distance: 10,000 meters

Men's Team Result (Top 10)

Men's Individual Result (Top 10)

Women's title
Distance: 6,000 meters

Women's Team Result (Top 10)

Women's Individual Result (Top 10)

References
 

NCAA Cross Country Championships
NCAA Division I Cross Country Championships
NCAA Division I Cross Country Championships
NCAA Division I Cross Country Championships
Track and field in Indiana
Terre Haute, Indiana
Indiana State University